General Dick Lodewijk Berlijn (born March 18, 1950 in Amsterdam) is a retired Royal Netherlands Air Force four-star general, who served as Chief of Defence of the Netherlands (Chief of the Netherlands Defence Staff) from 2004, when he succeeded Lt. Adm. Luuk Kroon, until 2008, when he was succeeded by Gen. Peter van Uhm. In 2005, the post was renamed from Chef-Defensiestaf to Commandant der Strijdkrachten ("Commander of the Armed Forces") following a reorganisation, but the term "Chief of Defence Staff" is still the one usually used in English translations. His office saw Dutch military presence in Uruzgan with ISAF, as well as naval contributions to the United Nations Interim Force in Lebanon, among other interventions. He has been awarded with the Légion d'honneur and the Legion of merit, and the Order of Orange-Nassau, all in the degree of commander, and the Order of Orange-Nassau with swords. Berlijn graduated from the Koninklijke Militaire Academie in 1973.

Awards and honours
 Commander in the Order of Orange-Nassau with the Swords
 Commander in the Legion of Merit 
 Commander in the Legion of Honour 
 Cross for the Four Day Marches 
 Officers Cross
 NATO Medal for the former Yugoslavia

References

1950 births
Living people
Chiefs of Defence (Netherlands)
Chiefs of the Defence Staff (Netherlands)
Commanders of the Royal Netherlands Air Force
Royal Netherlands Air Force generals
Royal Netherlands Air Force officers
Royal Netherlands Air Force pilots
Dutch military personnel of the War in Afghanistan (2001–2021)
Military personnel from Amsterdam
Members of the People's Party for Freedom and Democracy
Recipients of the Legion of Merit
Commanders of the Order of Orange-Nassau
Commandeurs of the Légion d'honneur
Graduates of the Koninklijke Militaire Academie